Cross Creek Wildlife Management Area is located on  in Brooke County near Wellsburg, West Virginia. Mixed hardwoods cover most of the former strip mine site. The rolling terrain is punctuated with a few highwalls and ponds.

Hunting and Fishing

Hunting opportunities include deer, grouse,  turkey and waterfowl. Cross Creek provides fishing opportunities for smallmouth bass, largemouth bass, bluegill and channel catfish, as well as stocked trout.

Camping is prohibited on the Cross Creek WMA land.

See also
Animal conservation
Fishing
Hunting
List of West Virginia wildlife management areas

References

External links
 West Virginia DNR District 1 Wildlife Management Areas
West Virginia Hunting Regulations
West Virginia Fishing Regulations

Wildlife management areas of West Virginia
Protected areas of Brooke County, West Virginia
IUCN Category V